Serin may refer to the following people
Given name
Serin George, Indian fashion photographer and model
Serin Murray (born 1981), Australian mixed martial artist

Surname
Baptiste Serin (born 1994), French rugby union player
Casey Serin (born 1982), Uzbekistan-born American blogger
Mathias Serin (born 1991), French football midfielder
Muhittin Serin (born 1945), Calligrapher